Benjamin Henderson, nicknamed "Rabbit", is an American former Negro league pitcher who played in the 1930s.

Henderson played for the Birmingham Black Barons in 1937. In five recorded appearances on the mound, he posted an 8.63 ERA over 24 innings.

References

External links
 and Seamheads

Year of birth missing
Place of birth missing
Birmingham Black Barons players
Baseball pitchers